This article lists the results for the sport of Squash in 2014.

2014 PSA World Series
January 17–24: Tournament of Champions 2014 in  New York City
 Amr Shabana defeated  Grégory Gaultier 11–8, 11–3, 11–4.
February 26 – March 3: Windy City Open 2014 in  Richmond, Virginia
 Grégory Gaultier defeated  Ramy Ashour 11–7, 11–3, 11–4.
April 13 – 18: El Gouna International 2014 in 
 Ramy Ashour defeated  Mohamed El Shorbagy 11–7, 12–10, 8–11, 11–8.
May 12 – 18: 2014 Men's British Open in  Kingston upon Hull
 Grégory Gaultier defeated  Nick Matthew 11–3, 11–6, 11–2.
August 26 – 31: Men's Hong Kong squash Open 2014 in 
 Mohamed El Shorbagy defeated  Grégory Gaultier 11–9, 11–2, 4–11, 8–11, 11–4.
October 13 – 18: US Open in  Philadelphia
 Mohamed El Shorbagy defeated fellow Egyptian, Amr Shabana, 8–11, 11–9, 11–3, 11–3.
November 14 – 21: 2014 Men's World Open Squash Championship in  Doha
 Ramy Ashour defeated fellow Egyptian, Mohamed El Shorbagy, 13–11, 7–11, 5–11, 11–5, 14–12, to claim his third World Open Squash title.

2014 WSA World Series
March 14 – 21: 2013 Women's World Open Squash Championship in  Penang
  Laura Massaro defeated  Nour El Sherbini 11–7, 6-11, 11–9, 5-11, 11–9.
May 11 – 18: 2014 Women's British Open Squash Championship in   Kingston upon Hull
  Nicol David defeated  Laura Massaro 8–11, 11–5, 11–7, 11–8.
August 18 – 23: Women's Malaysian Open Squash Championships 2014 in  Kuala Lumpur
  Raneem El Weleily defeated fellow Egyptian, Nour El Tayeb, 7–11, 11–3, 12–10, 2–11, 11–7.
August 27 – 31: Women's Hong Kong squash Open 2014 in 
  Nicol David defeated  Nour El Tayeb 11–4, 12–10, 11–8.
October 13 – 18: US Open in  Philadelphia
  Nicol David defeated  Nour El Sherbini 11–5, 12–10, 12–10.
December 15 – 20: 2014 Women's World Open Squash Championship in  Cairo
  Nicol David defeated  Raneem El Weleily 5–11, 11–8, 7–11, 14–12, 11–5, to claim her eighth World Open Squash title.

Other squash events
 December 1 – 6: 2014 Women's World Team Squash Championships in  Niagara-on-the-Lake
 Champions:  (seventh Women's World Team Squash Championships title); Second: ; Third:

External links
 World Squash: official website of the World Squash Federation

 
Squash by year